The S1B reactor is a naval reactor used by the United States Navy to provide electricity generation and propulsion on Columbia-class submarines.  The S1B designation stands for:

 S = Submarine platform
 1 = First generation core designed by the contractor
 B = Bechtel Marine Propulsion Corporation is the contracted designer

This pressurized water reactor style nuclear reactor, designed by Knolls Atomic Power Laboratory, is designed to have increased energy density. 

This reactor is designed to operate for 40 years without refueling.

References

United States naval reactors